Eslamabad (also Romanized as Eslāmābād) is a village in Roshtkhar Rural District, in the Central District of Roshtkhar County, Razavi Khorasan Province, Iran. At the 2006 census, its population was 216, in 51 families.

References 

Populated places in Roshtkhar County